Walter Fernando Pedraza Morales (born November 27, 1981 in Soacha) is a Colombian professional road racing cyclist, who currently rides for Colombian amateur team Team Cartagena. Pedraza is a two-time winner of the Colombian National Road Race Championships in 2005 and 2013.

Major results

2004
 8th Overall Clásico RCN
2005
 1st  Road race, National Road Championships
 2nd Overall Vuelta a Colombia
1st Stage 3
2006
 1st Stage 7 Vuelta a Colombia
 5th Overall Tour de Langkawi
 6th Overall Vuelta al Táchira
 7th Overall Vuelta Ciclista de Chile
2007
 1st Stage 10 Vuelta al Táchira
 3rd Overall Tour de Langkawi
 4th Overall Vuelta Ciclista de Chile
1st Stage 9
2008
 3rd Road race, National Road Championships
 3rd Overall Vuelta a Burgos
 8th Overall Tour of Austria
2009
 3rd Overall Tour of Bulgaria
2010
 2nd Overall Tour of Szeklerland
 4th Overall Tour of Małopolska
 4th Overall Tour des Pyrénées
 6th Overall Tour of Romania
 9th Grand Prix de la ville de Nogent-sur-Oise
2011
 7th Overall Vuelta a Colombia
1st Stage 1
2012
 1st  Mountains classification Vuelta a Castilla y León
 1st  Mountains classification Vuelta a Asturias
2013
 1st  Road race, National Road Championships
 8th Road race, Pan American Road Championships
2014
 Vuelta a Colombia
1st  Mountains classification
1st Stage 1 (TTT)
 5th Overall Vuelta a Guatemala
1st  Mountains classification
 6th Overall Tour do Brasil
1st Stage 7
2017
 5th Overall Vuelta Ciclista a Costa Rica
2018
 5th Road race, National Road Championships

Grand Tour general classification results timeline

References

External links 

1981 births
Living people
Colombian male cyclists
Vuelta a Colombia stage winners
People from Cundinamarca Department